John Bradford Fisher (born 1953) is an American plastic surgeon who pioneered suction fat removal, or liposuction.

Liposuction 
Fisher was one of the first American authors to present the concept of selective fat removal without traditional skin resection. Published in 1981 with Dr. Bahman Teimouran, this article first introduced fat removal exclusively with suction through a tube called a cannula—a modified fascia lata harvesting instrument that did not disrupt the overlying skin attachments ("tissue arcade preservation"). The concept of selective fat removal was previously introduced and presented by a number of independent European surgeons: Schruder, Georgio Fischer, Meyer and Kesselring, Fournier, and Illouz. Prior to the 1981 publication, the procedure—later termed liposuction—was not commonly performed.   The safety of the procedure was enhanced by the use of fluid infusion, termed tumescence, a concept formulated by Dr. Andrew Klein.

Career 
In 1982, Fisher enlisted in for the United States Navy; in 1983, he  became one of the youngest Chiefs of Department of Plastic Surgery at the National Naval Medical Center, and was appointed  Assistant Professor of Surgery at the Uniformed Services University of the Health Sciences. Fisher also served as consultant in plastic and reconstructive surgery at the National Institutes of Health, and was head of the Cleft Lip and Palate Clinic and Melanoma Skin Cancer Clinic. He was also a consultant in hand surgery for the Department of Orthopedics, and in Microscopic-Assisted Peripheral Nerve Surgery for the Department of Neurosurgery.

As a Clinical Fellow in Surgery at the Columbia University College of Physicians and Surgeons and St. Luke's-Roosevelt Hospital Center in New York City, Fisher co-authored one of the first textbook presentations on body image.  Psychological considerations in plastic surgery, and the resultant overt changes in self-esteem, were not clearly identified and continue to be an unpredictable aspect of physical changes brought about by cosmetic surgery.

Fisher was a contributing and consulting editor to Plastic Surgery Products Magazine between 1995 and 2006, authoring contributions on such diverse subjects as "A Layman's Guide to Lasers" (1995), "The Perioperative Guide to Cosmetic Surgery" (1996), "The Phenol Peel: The Secret of Youth in Croton Oil", and "Liposuction: Do's and Don'ts".

References

External links
 

Living people
American surgeons
1953 births